Sardasht District is a district (bakhsh) in Dezful County, Khuzestan Province, Iran. In a 2006 census, its population was 35,246, in 6,536 families.  The district has one city: Saland. The district has seven rural districts (dehestan): Ahmadfedaleh Rural District, Darreh Kayad Rural District, Emamzadeh Seyyed Mahmud Rural District, Mahur Berenji Rural District, Sardasht Rural District, Seyyedvaliyeddin Rural District, and Shahi Rural District.

References 

Dezful County
Districts of Khuzestan Province